Farhad Humayun (5 October 1978 – 8 June 2021) was a Pakistani singer, drummer, record producer and video artist. He was popularly associated with the Pakistani drum jam band Overload which he founded in 2003. Farhad started his career as underground musician and formed two bands Co-Ven and Mindriot as a drummer. He worked with artists such as Atif Aslam, Symt, Maha Ali Kazmi and Meesha Shafi. Humayun received many awards and accolades for his work. He was also the owner of Riot Studios, a recording studio and music performance venue in Lahore.

Early life 
Humayun was born on 5 October 1978 in the British Channel Island of Jersey at the Jersey International Hospital to parents Navid (née Rahman) and Shahzad Humayun. His mother was a TV, theatre and film actress, scholar, and academic. She was also a recipient of the Pride of Performance, the highest literary award in Pakistan. His father was an automobile salesman and an award-winning cricket commentator in Pakistan between the 1970s and the 2000s. Humayun's maternal grandfather S. A. Rahman was a Judge at the Supreme Court of Pakistan and then Chief Justice of Pakistan in the 1960s.

Farhad grew up in the Gulberg area of Lahore and studied at Aitchison College until secondary school. He went to the National College of Arts in Lahore where he earned his bachelor's degree in fine arts in painting between 1997 and 2000. He also studied audio engineering at the Recording Workshop in Ladbroke Grove, London.

Career 
Humayun started playing drums at age 14 and was a regular in the underground movement in Lahore, Karachi and Islamabad in the early 1990s. His influences at the time were mostly metal bands, such as Judas Priest, Dio, Black Sabbath, AC/DC. He started as the drummer in the alternative rock band Co-Ven playing some originals but mostly covers by Pearl Jam, Soundgarden, Nirvana, as was the norm at the time when satellite television was catching on in Pakistan. He formed his own metal band in 1994 called Mindriot inspired by the Soundgarden song.

Humayun recorded drums and toured with major Pakistani rock acts such as Noori and Fuzön and also served as the house band drummer for Coke Studio (Pakistani season 5) in 2012. He wrote with and recorded Atif Aslam on his first three albums as well as on Coke Studio. Farhad produced Meri Kahani by Atif Aslam in 2006.

While studying at the National College of Arts, Humayun started casually jamming with friends at events of the college's Western Music Society, of which he was the president. That laid the foundation of one of Pakistan's most iconic and original acts Overload in 2003. The band's mix of the modern (trap) drums set with traditional, mystical Dhol (drum), alternating between Indian Classical beats and Rock became a rage in Pakistan. Overload was a band of choice at fundraisers, celebrations, and cricket matches opening and closing ceremonies, such as the launching ceremony of the Pakistan Super League team Lahore Qalandars. Known as the "loudest band of Pakistan", Overload won numerous awards, including the Lux Style Award for Best Live Act in 2006.

Humayun remains the artist with the most number of nominations for a musician at the Lux Style Awards with 13 nominations and two wins. He was also a successful businessman and owned and ran an entertainment and arts company Riot Productions (subsidiaries Riot Films, Riot Studios). Humayun was also termed as the Pride of Pakistan by a popular newspaper Daily Times (Pakistan). His song Jeet  was played at Prime Minister Imran Khan's rally in Washington D.C in 2019.

Collaborations 
Humayun had multiple collaborations with other Pakistan-based artists including Ustad Jaffar, Nasir Sain, Pappu Sain and Tanveer Sain. He also released English singles including Give In produced by Richard Hilton, keyboardist of the band Chic. The songs feature iconic musicians like Tony Levin on bass, David Torn on guitars and Richy Stano also on guitars. Recorded at Clubhouse Studios in Rhinebeck New York, the song was released in 2018. Farhad started his solo career in 2018 and released a number of singles including Murr Ke Dekho and Kambakht with Faiza Mujahid.

Endorsements 
Humayun was a brand ambassador for big brands, such as Porsche, Dell, Samsung, Chester Bernard clothing, and telecommunications companies including Mobilink, and Warid. He was featured in the television advertisement for Samsung Galaxy A.

As of 2019, Humayun was the producer for Levi's Live, a project of the Levi Strauss & Co. on the revival of live music in Pakistan. He also produced Pepsi Smash for Pepsi Pakistan.

Personal life 
Humayun was married to Asmaa Mumtaz. They were divorced at the time of his death. In October 2018, Farhad was diagnosed with a brain tumor. The singer announced a full recovery the next month after the tumor was removed successfully.

Humayun died on 8 June 2021 of undisclosed causes.

Awards

References

External links 

 Farhad Humayun on Facebook
Farhad Humayun on Instagram
Farhad Humayun on Twitter
Farhad Humayun on SoundCloud

Musicians from Lahore
1978 births
2021 deaths
Pakistani audio engineers
Pakistani drummers
21st-century Pakistani male singers
Jersey people
21st-century drummers
Pakistani male singer-songwriters
Aitchison College alumni
Pakistani percussionists
National College of Arts alumni